Trichotriidae is a family of rotifers belonging to the order Ploima.

Genera:
 Macrochaetus Perty, 1850
 Pulchritia Luo & Segers, 2013
 Trichotria Bory De St.Vincent, 1827
 Wolga Skorikov, 1903

References

Ploima
Rotifer families